Matthew Myers (born 6 November 1984) is a Welsh ice hockey player who plays for Nottingham Panthers and the British national team.

He represented Great Britain at the 2019 IIHF World Championship, 2021 IIHF World Championship and 2022 IIHF World Championship. Myers also passed 100 senior caps for Great Britain at the World Championships in May 2021.

Career statistics

References

External links

1984 births
Living people
Bakersfield Condors (1998–2015) players
British expatriate ice hockey people
Welsh expatriate sportspeople in the United States
Cardiff Devils players
Johnstown Chiefs players
Nottingham Panthers players
Sheffield Steelers players
Swindon Wildcats players
Sportspeople from Cardiff
Welsh ice hockey forwards
Expatriate ice hockey players in the United States